Dariusz Pawlusiński (born 24 November 1977 in Będzin) is a Polish midfielder who plays for Unia Turza Śląska.

External links
 

1977 births
Living people
People from Będzin
MKS Cracovia (football) players
Dyskobolia Grodzisk Wielkopolski players
GKS Bełchatów players
Bruk-Bet Termalica Nieciecza players
Raków Częstochowa players
Ekstraklasa players
Polish footballers
Sportspeople from Silesian Voivodeship
Association football midfielders